The women's 63 kilograms (Half middleweight) competition at the 2002 Asian Games in Busan was held on 1 October at the Gudeok Gymnasium.

Schedule
All times are Korea Standard Time (UTC+09:00)

Results

Main bracket

Repechage

References
2002 Asian Games Report, Page 467

External links
 
 Official website

W63
Judo at the Asian Games Women's Half Middleweight
Asian W63